The Duchess is a 2008 historical drama film directed by Saul Dibb. It is based on Amanda Foreman's biography of the late 18th-century English aristocrat Georgiana Cavendish, Duchess of Devonshire. She was an ancestor of Diana, Princess of Wales, where the quote ‘There were three people in her marriage’ in the promotional poster comes from. It was released in September 2008 in the United Kingdom. The film won the Academy Award for Best Costume Design, and was nominated for Best Art Direction.

Plot 
The young Georgiana is contracted in marriage to William Cavendish, Duke of Devonshire, with the expectation that she produce his male heir. Georgiana is quickly disillusioned by her husband, especially when Charlotte, an illegitimate child fathered by William whose mother has died, comes to live with them while Georgiana is pregnant. William expects Georgiana to tolerate the child's presence. He also suggests that she "practise mothering" on the young girl. When Georgiana gives birth to a girl, William is displeased. In his mind, he has fulfilled his obligations to her as her husband but, by failing to provide him with a legitimate male heir, she has failed in her obligations as his wife.

Georgiana becomes a leading light in fashionable society.  She socialises with the young Lady Bess Foster at Bath and invites her to live with them since Bess has nowhere else to go. William has an affair with Bess, causing Georgiana to feel robbed of her only friend and betrayed by Bess. Bess tells Georgiana that her motive is to regain her three sons (whom her husband has taken from her), so she continues to live with them.

Georgiana starts an affair with Charles Grey. William is outraged when Georgiana suggests that since he has Bess, she should be allowed Charles. William rapes Georgiana; a male child is the product. Bess encourages the affair between Georgiana and Charles after the birth of Georgiana's son. Soon, the whole of London society learns of Georgiana's affair. William threatens to end Charles's political career and forbid Georgiana from seeing her children again if she does not end the relationship. After initially refusing, Georgiana ends her relationship with Grey but tells William that she is pregnant with Charles' child. She is sent to the countryside where she gives birth to her daughter with Grey, Eliza Courtney, who is given to the Grey family to raise as Charles' niece.

Georgiana finds comfort in Bess's friendship during her time of giving birth to Eliza. Georgiana and William come to terms with one another and, along with Bess, continue their lives together.

The after-credits reveal Georgiana secretly visits her daughter Eliza. Eliza goes on to name her own daughter Georgiana, after her mother. Charles later becomes Prime Minister under William IV. Before she dies, Georgiana permits William and Bess to marry.

Cast 
 Keira Knightley as Georgiana Cavendish, Duchess of Devonshire
 Ralph Fiennes as William Cavendish, 5th Duke of Devonshire
 Hayley Atwell as Lady Elizabeth 'Bess' Foster
 Charlotte Rampling as Georgiana Spencer, Countess Spencer, Georgiana's mother
 Dominic Cooper as Charles Grey, 2nd Earl Grey
 Aidan McArdle as The Right Honourable Richard Brinsley Sheridan
 Simon McBurney as The Right Honourable Charles James Fox
 Sebastian Applewhite as Sir Augustus Clifford, 1st Baronet
 Calvin Dean as Devonshire House Servant
 Emily Jewell as Nanny
 Richard McCabe as Sir James Hare
 Bruce Mackinnon as actor playing Sir Peter Teazle in The School for Scandal
 Alistair Petrie as Heaton
 Georgia King as actress playing Lady Teazle in The School for Scandal
 Camilla Arfwedson as Lady Charlotte

Production 
The Duchess was produced by British Qwerty Films and American Magnolia Mae Films, with financial support from BBC Films, French Pathé and Italian BIM Distribuzione. The film was shot at Twickenham Film Studios and on location at Chatsworth, Bath, Holkham Hall, Clandon Park, Kedleston Hall, Somerset House, King's College London and the Old Royal Naval College in Greenwich.

Regarding lead actress Keira Knightley, director Saul Dibb said The Duchess was "a chance to take a character from late childhood – she's married at 17 – into full adulthood, 10 years later." It was also a chance for Knightley to work with Ralph Fiennes, whom she regarded as one of her most accomplished co-stars to date; Dibb said, "When I said, 'We've got Ralph interested in playing the Duke,' we both took a gulp and went, 'F---.'  ... But I didn't for one second feel that she wasn't up to the task." Originally, the film was to be directed by Susanne Bier.

Release

Marketing 

Studio executives wanted to use digitally altered images of Keira Knightley in promotional materials. The alterations were specifically aimed at enlarging her breasts. Knightley objected to the alterations, and they were not used. Although multiple media reports suggested that the use of parallels between the central character's life and that of Diana, Princess of Wales was being used as a marketing strategy for the project, Knightley denied any such connection.

Theatrical release 
The BBFC has classified the film as a 12A, citing the scene of implied marital rape, which is "delivered through Georgiana's screams of protest, heard from outside the bedroom door." The BBFC's PG rating allows implied sex as long as it is discreet and infrequent; the board decided that the scene in The Duchess is more than "discreet" or "implied". The film had its world premiere on 3 September 2008, in Leicester Square and was released nationwide in the United Kingdom on 5 September.

Critical response 

The film received mostly positive reviews. Rotten Tomatoes gives a score of 62% based on 170 reviews, with an average rating of 6.3/10. The site's consensus reads: "While The Duchess treads the now-familiar terrain of the corset-ripper, the costumes look great and Keira Knightley's performance is stellar in this subtly feminist, period drama." Metacritic assigned the film a weighted average score of 62 out of 100, based on 34 critics, indicating "generally favorable reviews".

Most reviewers highly praised Knightley and Fiennes' performances. Time Out London wrote: "[Saul Dibb] is also helped enormously by a mature, restrained portrayal from Knightley, a masterclass in passive aggression from Fiennes and a performance of tender seduction from Atwell." Film Ireland writes "It is a slow movie, but it is well-acted with Knightley and Fiennes suited to their roles, especially Fiennes who gives a formidable and powerful performance." Cameron Bailey, the co-chair of the Toronto International Film Festival comments, "The Duchess Of Devonshire, with Keira Knightley, which is a beautiful film and she gives a really mature performance. You're seeing her really turn into something beyond the kind of pretty face that we've seen her do already so well. But she's actually a very serious actress, and she's turning into a great, great performer."

Peter Bradshaw of The Guardian wrote that "Dibb's movie looks good" but complained the film was "exasperatingly bland and slow-moving at all times" handing out a 2 of 5-star rating. However, Paul Hurley gave the film 8/10 and called The Duchess "an excellent new film" and states that "The Duchess stands a good chance of taking home some very big prizes at the end of the year".

Roger Ebert gave the film 3.5 stars out of 4, writing, "I deeply enjoyed the film, but then I am an Anglophile. I imagine the behavior of the characters will seem exceedingly odd to some viewers. Well, it is."

Accolades

References

External links
 
 
 
 
 

2008 films
2008 biographical drama films
2008 romantic drama films
2000s English-language films
2000s historical drama films
2000s historical romance films
American biographical drama films
American historical drama films
American historical romance films
American romantic drama films
BAFTA winners (films)
British biographical drama films
British historical drama films
British historical romance films
British romantic drama films
Films about rape
Films based on biographies
Films directed by Saul Dibb
Films scored by Rachel Portman
Films set in the 18th century
Films set in country houses
Films set in England
Films that won the Best Costume Design Academy Award
Films with screenplays by Anders Thomas Jensen
French biographical drama films
French historical drama films
French historical romance films
French romantic drama films
Italian biographical drama films
Italian historical drama films
Italian historical romance films
Italian romantic drama films
Qwerty Films films
2000s American films
2000s British films
2000s French films